The West Sudanian savanna is a tropical savanna ecoregion that extends across West Africa.

Geography
The ecoregion stretches east and west across West Africa, from the Atlantic coast of Senegal to the Mandara Mountains on Nigeria's eastern border.

The drier Sahelian Acacia savanna lies to the north, and the more humid Guinean forest-savanna mosaic lies to the south.

Climate
The climate is a tropical savanna climate and a hot semi-arid climate (Köppen climate classification Aw and BSh) with a dry season and a wet season and the temperature being warm and hot year-round. Annual rainfall ranges from 1000 mm in the south to 600 mm in the north on the edge of the Sahel. Rainfall and temperature vary seasonally, with a hot rainy season from May to September, and a cooler dry season from October to April. Temperatures range from 30 °C to 33 °C during the hottest month, and 18 °C to 21 °C during the coolest month.

Examples

Flora
Savanna and open woodland are the characteristic vegetation types. Species of Combretum and Terminalia are the typical savanna trees, and the ground is covered with long grasses, herbs, and shrubs. Species of Hyparrhenia, or elephant grass, is the predominant grass, and often grows 1 meter or more in height. Trees in the drier woodlands generally less than 10 meters high, and include Anogeissus spp. with Acacia spp., Balanites aegyptiaca, Combretum glutinosum, Commiphora africana, Prosopis africana, Tamarindus indica, and Ziziphus mucronata. Many trees lose their leaves during the height of the dry season, and the grasses often dry out.

Acacia is less common in the wetter woodlands in higher-rainfall areas and along watercourses, where Afzelia africana, Burkea africana, Combretum spp. and Terminalia spp. are predominant. Smaller areas of Isoberlinia woodland occur in more humid portions of the southern ecoregion.

Fauna
The ecoregion is home to many large mammals, including African bush elephant (Loxodonta africana), West African giraffe (Giraffa camelopardalis peralta), giant eland (Taurotragus derbianus derbianus), roan antelope (Hippotragus equinus), African buffalo (Syncerus caffer brachyceros), lion (Panthera leo), leopard (Panthera pardus) cheetah (Acinonyx jubatus), and African wild dog (Lycaon pictus). Most large mammals are now very limited in range and numbers.

Conservation
A 2017 assessment found that 233,942 km², or 14%, of the ecoregion is in protected areas.

Notes

External links

References

Afrotropical ecoregions
Ecoregions of Africa
Sub-Saharan Africa
Ecoregions of Benin
Ecoregions of Burkina Faso
Ecoregions of the Gambia
Ecoregions of Ghana
Ecoregions of Guinea
Ecoregions of Ivory Coast
Ecoregions of Mali
Ecoregions of Niger
Ecoregions of Nigeria
Ecoregions of Senegal
Ecoregions of Togo
Tropical and subtropical grasslands, savannas, and shrublands